Vokesinotus is a genus of sea snails, marine gastropod mollusks in the family Muricidae, the murex snails or rock snails.

Species
 † Vokesinotus lepidotus (Dall, 1890) 
 Vokesinotus perrugatus (Conrad, 1846)

References

 Petuch E.J. (1988). Neogene history of tropical American mollusks. Charlottesville, Virginia: The Coastal Education and Research Foundation. 217 pp., 23 figs + unnumbered figs, 39 pls.

External links
 W.H. Dall, Transactions of the Wagner Free Institute of Science of Philadelphia  v.3:pt.1-3 (1890-1895)
 Barco, A.; Herbert, G.; Houart, R.; Fassio, G. & Oliverio, M. (2017). A molecular phylogenetic framework for the subfamily Ocenebrinae (Gastropoda, Muricidae). Zoologica Scripta. 46 (3): 322-335.